Seth Haley, known by his stage name Com Truise, is an American electronic musician. His stage name is a spoonerism of the name of American actor Tom Cruise.

Biography
Prior to 2010, Com Truise had released music under the pseudonyms Sarin Sunday, SYSTM, and Airliner.

In 2010, the first Com Truise recording, the Cyanide Sisters EP, was released.  Initially, the EP was a free download from the AMDISCS record label. Ghostly International digitally reissued it in January 2011. Haley resigned from his job as art director prior to this release. Com Truise remixed Daft Punk's song "ENCOM, Part II" for the Tron: Legacy Reconfigured album soon after. In June 2011, he released his debut album, Galactic Melt. In Decay was the immediate full-length followup in 2012. Com Truise's songs are represented by Downtown Music Publishing.

Haley is from Oneida, New York, and now resides in Orlando, Florida.

In February 2022, Com Truise produced the music for Coinbase's viral Super Bowl LVI advertisement. He sampled the Beatles' cover of "Money (That's What I Want)". In April 2022, he released a course on producing music with online music school Soundfly.

Style
Truise's sound is synthesizer-heavy synthwave, influenced by 1980s musical styles, as first offered on the Cyanide Sisters EP.

The "Com Truise" saga
All of the Com Truise albums, starting with Cyanide Sisters and ending with Iteration, tell the story of a space traveller named Com Truise; Haley described the character as a "synthetic astronaut", and the story as a tale about escaping an oppressed society.

Equipment
Truise uses a mix of digital and analogue hardware, including emulations of classic synthesisers and romplers. According to a 2015 MusicRadar interview, his DAWs of choice are Reason and Ableton.

Since 2017, he has incorporated the Dave Smith Instruments OB-6 on some tracks, also using it during live performances.

Com Truise discography

Studio albums

Extended plays

Compilation albums

Productions
 Little Boots – "Business Pleasure" (Business Pleasure EP, December 2014)
 Oddience – "Watermelon" (April 2015)
 ionnalee – "Not Human" (Everyone Afraid to Be Forgotten, February 2018)

Remixes
 FOE – "A Handsome Stranger Called Death (Com Truise RMX)" (August 2010)
 Neon Indian – "Sleep Paralysist (Com Truise 'Disorder' Remix)" (November 2010)
 Neon Indian – "Sleep Paralysist (Com Truise 'Eyelid' Remix)" (November 2010)
 Twin Shadow – "Castles In The Snow (Com Truise Remix)" (November 2010)
 Franklin – "I Know (Com Truise Remix)" (January 2011)
 Daft Punk – "Encom Part 2 (Com Truise Remix)" (April 2011)
 Hussle Club – "Loose Tights (Com Truise Tight Pants Remix)" (April 2011)
 Ana Lola Roman – "Klutch (Com Truise Remix)" (April 2011)
 Locussolus – "Throwdown (Com Truise Remix)" (June 2011)
 Foster the People – "Helena Beat (Com Truise Remix)" (December 2011)
 Arsenal – "One Day At A Time (Com Truise Remix)" (February 2012)
 ZZ Ward – "Criminal ft Freddie Gibbs (Com Truise Remix)" (July 2012)
 Saint Michel – "Katherine (Com Truise Remix)" (September 2012)
 Sky Ferreira – "Red Lips (Com Truise Remix)" (September 2012)
 Maroon 5 – "One More Night (Com Truise Remix)" (October 2012)
 Sally Shapiro – "What Can I Do (Com Truise Remix)" (November 2012)
 El Ten Eleven – "Thanks Bill (Com Truise Remix)" (April 2013)
Stars – "Hold On When You Get Love And Let Go When You Give It (Com Truise Remix)" (April 2013)
 Everything Everything – "Kemosabe (Com Truise Remix)" (May 2013)
 Charli XCX – "What I Like (Com Truise Remix)" (May 2013)
 Darkness Falls – "Timeline (Com Truise Remix)" (July 2013)
 Blood Diamonds feat. Dominic Lord – "Barcode (Com Truise Remix)" (September 2013)
 The Twilight Sad – "Sick (Com Truise Remix)" (October 2013)
 Kris Menace feat. Lawrence LT Thompson – "Love Is Everywhere (Com Truise Remix)" (October 2013)
 beGun – "Shanghai (Com Truise Remix)" (October 2013)
 Bloodgroup – "Mysteries Undone (Com Truise Remix)" (December 2013)
 Flight Facilities – "Stand Still feat. Micky Green (Com Truise Remix)" (December 2013)
 The Knocks – "Learn To Fly (Com Truise Remix)" (December 2013)
 Hollow & Akimbo – "Singularity (Com Truise Remix)" (January 2014)
 Client Liaison – "Free Of Fear (Com Truise Remix)" (January 2014)
 Junior Prom – "Sheila Put The Knife Down (Com Truise Remix)" (February 2014)
 Weeknight – "Dark Light (Com Truise Remix)" (February 2014)
 Tapioca and the Flea – "Take It Slow (Com Truise Remix)" (April – June 2014)
 Tycho – "Awake (Com Truise Remix)" (25 June 2014)
 Bear Hands – "Agora (Com Truise Remix)" (October 2014)
 Kodak to Graph – "Iamanthem (Com Truise Remix)" (26 May 2015)
 Phantoms – "Broken Halo (feat. Nicholas Braun) [Com Truise Remix]" (25 September 2015)
 Digitalism – "Battlecry (Com Truise Remix)" (27 May 2016)
 Midnight to Monaco – "One in a Million (Com Truise Remix)" (10 June 2016)
 Deftones – "Prayers/Triangles (Com Truise Remix)" (24 June 2016)
 Deadmau5 – "Strobe (Com Truise Remix)" (23 September 2016)
 Moodoïd – "Planète Tokyo (Com Truise Remix)" (4 April 2018)
 ginla – "Infinite (Com Truise Remix)" (19 March 2019) – was featured in the second episode of the second season of the television show Happy!
 All Hail the Silence – "City Lovers (Com Truise Remix)" (7 June 2019)
Dua Saleh - "Warm Pants (Com Truise Remix)" (25 July 2019)
 Tycho – "No Stress (Com Truise Remix)" (15 December 2020)

SYSTM discography

Airliner discography

Filmography

Composer
 Private Property (2022)

References

External links

 

Synthwave musicians
American electronic musicians
Musicians from New Jersey
Living people
People from Princeton, New Jersey
People from Oneida, New York
1985 births